WMMG may refer to:

 WMMG-FM, a radio station (93.5 FM) licensed to serve Brandenburg, Kentucky, United States
 WMMG (AM), a defunct radio station (1140 AM) formerly licensed to serve Brandenburg, Kentucky